Andries Pretorius (born 26 September 1985) is a former Wales international rugby union player who played for Cardiff Blues in the Pro12 league and Worcester Warriors in the RFU Championship. He played at Number 8, but also played at Blindside Flanker and in the Second Row. He left Cardiff Blues to sign for Worcester Warriors in the RFU Championship from the 2014-15 season.  He never made his competitive debut for Worcester due to suffering a calf injury in pre-season. On 30 January 2015 it was announced he was to retire from rugby with immediate effect on medical grounds.

International career

Pretorius was born in South Africa and he became eligible to play for Wales through residency on 1 December 2012, and expressed his hope to do so. In January 2013 he was selected in the 35 man Wales squad for the 2013 Six Nations championship.

In May 2013 he was selected in the Wales national rugby union team 32 man training squad for the summer 2013 tour to Japan. He made his international debut against Japan on 8 June 2013.

References

External links
Blues Profile

1985 births
Living people
Welsh rugby union players
Wales international rugby union players
South African rugby union players
People from Mbombela
Rugby union players from Mpumalanga
Rugby union number eights
Cardiff Rugby players